S. Gandhiselvan (born 2 June 1963) is an Indian politician and former  member of the Parliament of India from Namakkal Constituency. He was the Minister of state for Health and Family Welfare, Govt. of India, from 22 May 2009 to 19 March 2013. He represents the Dravida Munnetra Kazhagam party

References 

Living people
India MPs 2009–2014
Dravida Munnetra Kazhagam politicians
Lok Sabha members from Tamil Nadu
People from Namakkal district
1963 births